Mary Cookman Bass (July 13, 1905 – August 26, 1996) was an American journalist, writer, and executive editor of the Ladies' Home Journal from 1936 to 1963.

Childhood and early years

Mary Carter Carson was born in Chicago in 1905. Both her parents were from California. Her father was a college professor but wanted to be in the newspaper business and eventually got a job with the Associated Press and was posted to Mexico. Mary lived in Mexico for 11 years.

She got into Barnard College after only 3 years of high school. She met her husband at a party while she was still at Barnard. He was 6 years older than she was and working as a newspaper reporter.

Career

Bass, then known as Mary Cookman (At the time she was the wife of New York Evening Post executive editor Joseph Cookman), joined the Ladies' Home Journal in 1936 as an editorial assistant but soon thereafter was named executive editor by the editors Bruce Gould and Beatrice Blackmar Gould. (Joseph Cookman died in 1944, Mary Cookman married New York lawyer Basil Bass in 1945, and she thereafter was known professionally as Mary Bass.)

Bass was responsible for day-to-day operations of the magazine while the Goulds engaged in longer range creative strategy and planning. Bass oversaw the creation of one of the most popular features of the Journal called How America Lives. This series of articles was supposed to run for one year. It ran for 20. With the Goulds, she also oversaw the launch in 1953 of "Can This Marriage Be Saved?" by journalist Dorothy Cameron Disney, who continued to research and write the column for 30 years.

The Goulds retired in 1962, and Bass left the Ladies' Home Journal the following year. Subsequently, she wrote a column for Family Circle called Careers at Home. She also published a book by the same name. Additionally, she worked at Seventeen.

A native of Chicago, Bass was the daughter of James S. Carson, who later was chairman of the Colonial Trust Company of New York. She graduated from Barnard College. She was a member of the Cosmopolitan Club, the Women's National Press Club, and the Overseas Press Club. She was married and widowed four times and had one son, Richardson C. Bass. Mary Bass Newlin died August 26, 1996, at her home in Amagansett, N.Y.

Timeline

8/28 Marries Joseph Cookman, an editor
1936 Joins Ladies' Home Journal (LHJ)
5/41 Moves to 570 Park Ave, NYC
8/44 Husband Joseph Cookman dies of heart attack
1945 War correspondent for LHJ
12/45 Marries Basil Bass, a lawyer
10/46 Son is born; moves to 850 Park Ave, NYC
11/56 Husband Basil Bass dies
8/60 Father James S. Carson dies
5/64 Marries George R. Gibson an advertising executive
6/69 Husband George R. Gibson drowns
1976 Marries A. Chauncey Newlin, a lawyer and philanthropist
1983 Husband A. Chauncey Newlin dies
8/96 Mary Cookman Bass Newlin dies

Notes

References 
 New York Times Obituaries September 8, 1996
 New York Times Obituaries August 10, 1960
 New York Times Obituaries August 13, 1944
 New York Times December 16, 1945
 New York Times Obituaries November 19, 1956
 New York Times May 17, 1964
 New York Times Obituaries June 22, 1969
 New York Times August 24, 1976
 New York Times Obituaries September 4, 1983

1905 births
1996 deaths
20th-century American women writers
Barnard College alumni
American women journalists
American magazine editors
American magazine writers
20th-century American non-fiction writers
Women magazine editors